Mount Echo is an unincorporated community in Ohio County, West Virginia, United States. Mount Echo is located along Little Wheeling Creek on the National Road (U.S. Route 40) near the Pennsylvania state line. It is part of the Wheeling, West Virginia Metropolitan Statistical Area.

References

Unincorporated communities in Ohio County, West Virginia
National Road
Unincorporated communities in West Virginia